The 1956 United States presidential election in Kentucky took place on November 6, 1956, as part of the 1956 United States presidential election. Kentucky voters chose ten representatives, or electors, to the Electoral College, who voted for president and vice president.

Kentucky was won by incumbent President Dwight D. Eisenhower (R–Pennsylvania), running with Vice President Richard Nixon, with 54.30 percent of the popular vote, against Adlai Stevenson (D–Illinois), running with Senator Estes Kefauver, with 45.21 percent of the popular vote. Along with Louisiana and West Virginia, Kentucky was one of the 3 states Eisenhower lost in 1952, but managed to flip in 1956.

Results

Results by county

Notes

References

Kentucky
1956
1956 Kentucky elections